Instinct is the second album by British singer Kavana. The album was recorded in Italy during the summer of 1998 and was produced by production team Absolute. The album spawned the singles "Special Kind of Something", "Funky Love" and "Will You Wait for Me". The album was released on 5 October 1998 by Virgin Records, released in Europe, Australia and Taiwan. The British release was postponed by the record label and was ultimately rescheduled for April 1999, however, Kavana was subsequently dropped from his label following poor sales of the three singles and the album was ultimately never released in the UK. The album was released digitally in the UK more than four years later on 1 March 2003.

Singles
 "Special Kind of Something" was released as the album's lead single on 17 August 1998, peaking at #13 on the UK Singles Chart. Additional tracks on the single release include; "Special Kind of Something" (Acoustic), "Is That You?" (B-side recording), "Special Kind of Something" (K-Gee master mix) and "Special Kind of Something" (K-Gee planet bounce mix).
 "Funky Love" was released as the album's second single on 30 November 1998, peaking at #32 on the UK Singles Chart. Additional tracks on the single release include; "Isn't Love Insane?" (B-side recording), "Funky Love" (spreadlove deep vocal mix), "Funky Love" (mash-up matt remix faded) and "Funky Love" (trouser enthusiasts pentagram deathtrap mix).
 "Will You Wait for Me" was released as the album's third and final single on 8 March 1999, peaking at #29 on the UK Singles Chart. Additional tracks on the single release include; "Will You Wait for Me" (Eric Kupper's S-boy radio mix), "Him or Me" (B-side recording), "Will You Wait for Me" (doolally vocal mix) and the enhanced video section.

Track listing

References

1999 albums
Kavana (singer) albums